Broadway is a 1926 Broadway play  produced by Jed Harris and written and directed by George Abbott and Philip Dunning. It was Abbott's first big hit on his way to becoming "the most famous play doctor of all time" after he "rejiggered" Dunning's play. The crime drama used "contemporary street slang and a hard-boiled, realistic atmosphere" to depict the New York City underworld during Prohibition. It opened on September 16, 1926, at the Broadhurst Theatre and was one of the venue's greatest hits, running for 603 performances.

Production

Written and directed by Philip Dunning and George Abbott, and produced by Jed Harris, Broadway opened September 16, 1926, at the Broadhurst Theatre in New York City. The cast is listed in order of appearance:

 Paul Porcasi as Nick Verdis
 Lee Tracy as Roy Lane
 Clare Woodbury as Lil Rice
 Ann Preston Bridgers as Katie
 Joseph Calleia as Joe
 Mildred Wall as Mazie Smith
 Edith Van Cleve as Ruby
 Eloise Stream as Pearl
 Molly Ricardel as Grace
 Constance Brown as Ann
 Sylvia Field as Billie Moore
 Robert Gleckler as Steve Crandall
 Henry Sherwood as Dolph
 William Foran as Porky Thompson
 John Wray as Scar Edwards
 Thomas Jackson as Dan McCorn
 Frank Verigun as Benny
 Millard Mitchell as Larry
 Roy R. Lloyd as Mike

Broadway was a smash hit, running for 603 performances. In addition to having his first prominent stage role, cast member Joseph Calleia acted as the company's stage manager and, working for producer Jed Harris, he supervised some ten duplicate productions of Broadway in the United States and abroad.

Adaptations

Film

Carl Laemmle paid $225,000 for the film rights in 1927, a sum that set a record. Universal Pictures released Broadway on September 15, 1929.

Television
A one-hour adaptation of Broadway starring Joseph Cotten and Piper Laurie aired May 4, 1955, on the CBS TV series The Best of Broadway.

Revivals

A 1978 Broadway-bound revival of Broadway, directed by Robert Allan Ackerman and musical staging by Dennis Grimaldi  closed during its Boston tryout.

References

External links

Oxford Companion to American Theatre entry, including plot summary

1926 plays
Broadway plays
American plays adapted into films